Turki bin Muqrin Al Saud (born 1973) is a pilot, businessman, the CEO of Rabigh Wings Aviation Academy (RWAA), and a member of the House of Saud. He also is the president of the Saudi Air Sports Federation.

Early life
Prince Turki was born in 1973. Prince Turki is the son of former Crown Prince Muqrin bin Abdulaziz, nephew of King Salman of Saudi Arabia, and one of King Abdulaziz's grandsons. He is a brother of Mansour bin Muqrin and Fahd bin Muqrin.

Career
In a Saudi Gazette interview, Prince Turki gave the synopsis, "I have been flying since 1991 and started with helicopters in the UK. When I moved back to Saudi Arabia, I learned from many people that it is much easier to fly fixed wing here than helicopters, so I went to study fixed wing flying and got my licence. I now hold the US Federal Aviation Agency (FAA) licence. Since I started flying in Saudi Arabia, I met many pilots and other people who would love to fly here, so I decided to start a flying school about two years ago."

Prince Turki is "a licensed helicopter and fixed wing pilot," and a board member of the Saudi Aviation Club. Prince Turki is a founding shareholder of the Arabian Shield Cooperative Insurance Company, holding 2% of the company. Prince Turki founded and owns a real-estate company in Turkey. Before RWAA, Prince Turki established aviation schools in the United Kingdom and Lebanon. He is also one of the main shareholders of RWAA.

On 27 May 2012, the Royal Jordanian Air Academy (RJAA) signed a Memorandum of Understanding with Rabigh Wings Aviation Academy "to develop cooperation between the two academies and share experiences in the fields of aviation and aircraft maintenance." The MoU was signed by Turki bin Muqrin bin Abdul-Aziz, and Director General of RJAA Captain Mohammed Khawaldeh.

Prince Turki is chairman of the Saudi Development and Training Company.

References

External links
 Welcome at Rabigh Wings Aviation Academy!

Turki
1973 births
Living people
Turki
Turki
Turki